Hearts on Fire is the sixteenth studio album by Canadian singer Colin James, released in 2015 by Universal Music Group. The lead single was "Just A Little Love", released early as a download. "Stay" is a cover of the Rihanna song.

Tracks

References

2015 albums
Colin James albums